The Non-Stop Kid is a 1918 American short comedy film featuring Harold Lloyd.

Plot
Bebe plays a pretty young thing with several suitors, including Harold, competing to win her affections.

Cast
 Harold Lloyd as Harold
 Snub Pollard as Snub, the butler (as Harry Pollard)
 Bebe Daniels as Miss Wiggle
 William Blaisdell as Bebe's father
 Sammy Brooks as Short bearded man
 Billy Fay as Prof. Fay
 William Gillespie (unconfirmed)
 Lew Harvey (unconfirmed)
 Bud Jamison (unconfirmed)
 Margaret Joslin (unconfirmed)
 Gus Leonard as Old man at party
 J. Darcie 'Foxy' Lloyd (as James Darsie Lloyd)
 Charles Stevenson (unconfirmed)
 Dorothea Wolbert (unconfirmed)
 Noah Young (unconfirmed)

See also
 Harold Lloyd filmography

References

External links

 The Non-Stop Kid on YouTube

1918 films
1918 short films
1918 comedy films
Silent American comedy films
American silent short films
American black-and-white films
American comedy short films
Films directed by Gilbert Pratt
Films with screenplays by H. M. Walker
Surviving American silent films
1910s American films
1910s English-language films